Rolf Schönauer (born 20 January 1961) is a Swiss retired footballer who played in the late 1970s and 1980s as defender.

Schönauer played his youth football by SC Binningen and advanced to their first team in 1977. During the summer 1978 he joined FC Basel's first team for their 1978–79 season under head-coach Helmut Benthaus. He played his first match for the club in the Swiss League Cup in an away match against Grenchen. He played his domestic league debut for the club in the away game on 19 June 1979 as Basel were defeated 2–4 by Zürich

In his two seasons with the club Schönauer played a total of nine games for Basel without scoring a goal. Two of these games were in the Nationalliga A, one in the Swiss League Cup and six were friendly games.

References

Sources
 Die ersten 125 Jahre. Publisher: Josef Zindel im Friedrich Reinhardt Verlag, Basel. 
 Verein "Basler Fussballarchiv" Homepage

SC Binningen players
FC Basel players
Swiss men's footballers
Association football defenders
1961 births
Living people